Balduina angustifolia, the coastal plain honeycombhead, is a North American species of plants in the sunflower family. It is native to the southeastern United States (Florida, Georgia, Alabama, Mississippi).

Balduina angustifolia is a perennial herb with branching stems. Each plant has 20 or more flower heads, each with yellow ray florets and yellow disc florets. The species grows in sandy soil, often in pinelands.

References

External links
Atlas of Florida Vascular Plants
Florida Native Plant Society
Lady Bird Johnson Wildflower Center, University of Texas
Rufino Osorio, photo of Balduina angustifolia – Coastal Plain Balduina

Helenieae
Endemic flora of the United States
Flora of Alabama
Flora of Florida
Flora of Georgia (U.S. state)
Flora of Mississippi
Plants described in 1911
Flora without expected TNC conservation status